Yunior Estrada Falcon (born 23 September 1986 in Camagüey) is a Cuban Greco-Roman wrestler. He competed in the Greco-Roman 96 kg event at the 2012 Summer Olympics, where he was defeated by Artur Aleksanyan in the bronze medal match.  This was an improvement on his 2008 Olympic result - in 2008, he competed in the light-heavyweight Greco-Roman division (84 kg), reaching the second round where he was beaten by Ara Abrahamian.

References

External links
 

1986 births
Living people
Cuban male sport wrestlers
Olympic wrestlers of Cuba
Wrestlers at the 2012 Summer Olympics
Wrestlers at the 2008 Summer Olympics
Sportspeople from Camagüey
Pan American Games medalists in wrestling
Pan American Games gold medalists for Cuba
Wrestlers at the 2011 Pan American Games
Medalists at the 2011 Pan American Games
20th-century Cuban people
21st-century Cuban people